The St. Albert Gazette is a mainstream newspaper distributed throughout St. Albert, Alberta founded in 1961. The paper was owned by Southam Inc., but is now owned by the publisher Great West Newspapers.

References

External links 
 

Newspapers published in Alberta
Postmedia Network publications
St. Albert, Alberta
Biweekly newspapers published in Canada